The Groove Thing is a Scandinavian record company based at Stocksund in Sweden, specialising in dance record releases. The label is an offshoot of TMC Records (The Music Company)

See also
 List of record labels

External links
The Dance Division
The Music Company  
The Dance Division

Swedish record labels
Electronic dance music record labels